Moshe Ben-Ze'ev (December 8, 1911 – June 25, 1995) was an Israeli jurist who served as Attorney General between 1963 and 1968.

Legal career
Ben-Ze'ev was born December 8, 1911 in Luninets in the Russian Empire (now in Belarus). He immigrated to Mandatory Palestine in 1935.

In the 1950s he worked as a judge in a Haifa District court and had close ties with the ruling Mapai party. In early 1963 he replaced Gideon Hausner as Attorney General after Hausner resigned to enter politics.

After concluding his term as Attorney General, Ben-Ze'ev opened a private practice with Aryeh Kamar. In 1980 he headed a commission to investigate abuse of civil servants who had exposed corruption.

Ben-Ze'ev died in Jerusalem on June 25, 1995 and was buried at the Mount of Beatitudes.

References

20th-century Israeli judges
Attorneys General of Israel
1911 births
1995 deaths
Soviet emigrants to Mandatory Palestine